The , sometimes anglicized as Hetaeriarch, was a high-ranking Byzantine officer, in command of the imperial bodyguard, the .

History
The Imperial  was a bodyguard regiment of the Byzantine emperors in the 9th–11th centuries, originally recruited mainly from among foreigners. It is first mentioned in 812, as a bodyguard for the emperor on campaign, but its origin is obscure. The Imperial  of the 9th–10th centuries was divided in several units: three or four according to the sources, distinguished by their epithets and each, at least originally, under is respective .

Thus the  commanded the 'Great '. It was a very important position in the late 9th and first half of the 10th centuries, as he was in charge of the emperor's security, and was entrusted with delicate assignments. It is telling that the future emperor Romanos Lekapenos held this post, and was succeeded by his son Christopher Lekapenos.

A 'Middle ' is attested in sources, but without its ; indeed, this unit appears to have been placed under the  during the course of the 10th century. Conversely, a 'Lesser ' is not attested but implied by the reference to Stylianos Zaoutzes as holding the post of  under Emperor Michael III.

In the 11th century, the post of  became detached from its military duties, but remained an important court position: it was held by several influential palace eunuchs in the 11th century, and by second-rank nobles and junior relatives of the Byzantine imperial family, such as George Palaiologos, in the Komnenian period. Under Manuel I Komnenos, the  became responsible for arms production and conducted important diplomatic missions.

In other Palaiologan-era lists, which include different ranks and offices and reflect the order of precedence at different times, he ranks as high as 23rd or as low as 27th. Their chief function, according to Pseudo-Kodinos, is as ushers at receptions.

According to Pseudo-Kodinos, the court costume of the  consisted of a plain silk  tunic and a staff topped with a gilded knob and covered with alternating golden and blue braid. For ceremonies and festivities, he bore the domed  hat, of yellow and golden silk and decorated with gold wire embroidery, and with a portrait of the emperor seated on a throne in front and another with the emperor on horseback on the rear. The ordinary  was dressed in a long silk , a  covered in red velvet and topped by a small red tassel or a  hat of the  style, and a golden-topped staff covered with alternating yellow and blue braid.

References

Sources 
 

  
 

Byzantine palace offices
Byzantine military offices